The following list includes commercially or artistically important inorganic pigments of natural and synthetic origin.

Purple pigments

Aluminum pigments

Ultramarine violet: (PV15) - a synthetic or naturally occurring sulfur containing silicate mineral.

Copper pigments

Han purple: BaCuSi2O6.

Cobalt pigments

Cobalt violet: (PV14) Co3(PO4)2.

Manganese pigments

Manganese violet: NH4MnP2O7 (PV16) manganic ammonium pyrophosphate.

Gold pigments

Purple of Cassius: Gold nanoparticles suspended in tin dioxide - Aux • SnO2.

Blue pigments
Aluminum pigments

Ultramarine (PB29): a synthetic or naturally occurring sulfur containing silicate mineral -  (generalized formula) 
Persian blue: made by grinding up the mineral Lapis lazuli. The most important mineral component of lapis lazuli is lazurite (25% to 40%), a feldspathoid silicate mineral with the formula .

Cobalt pigments

Cobalt blue (PB28): cobalt(II) aluminate.
Cerulean blue (PB35): cobalt(II) stannate.
Cerium uranium blue

Copper pigments

Egyptian blue: a synthetic pigment of calcium copper silicate (CaCuSi4O10). Thought to be the first synthetically produced pigment.
Han blue: BaCuSi4O10.
Azurite: cupric carbonate hydroxide (Cu3(CO3)2(OH)2).
Basic copper carbonate: Cu2(OH)2CO3.

Iron pigments

Prussian blue (PB27):  a synthetic inert pigment made of iron and cyanide: C18Fe7N18.

Manganese pigments

YInMn Blue: a synthetic pigment discovered in 2009 (YIn1−xMnxO3).
Manganese blue: barium manganate(VI) sulfate.

Green pigments

Cadmium pigments

Cadmium green: a light green pigment consisting of a mixture of cadmium yellow (CdS) and chrome green (Cr2O3).

Chromium pigments

Chrome green (PG17): anhydrous chromium(III) oxide (Cr2O3).
Viridian (PG18): hydrated chromium(III) oxide Cr2O3 • xH2O.
Cobalt pigments

Cobalt green: also known as Rinman's green or zinc green (CoZnO2).
 
Copper pigments

Malachite: cupric carbonate hydroxide (Cu2CO3(OH)2).
Scheele's Green (also called Schloss green): cupric arsenite (CuHAsO3).

Other pigments

Green earth: also known as terre verte and Verona green.

Yellow pigments 

Arsenic pigments
 Orpiment: natural monoclinic arsenic sulfide.

Bismuth pigments
 Primrose yellow (PY184): bismuth vanadate.

Cadmium pigments
 Cadmium yellow (PY37): cadmium sulfide (CdS), which also occurs as the mineral greenockite.

Chromium pigments
 Chrome yellow or crocoite (PY34): lead chromate.

Cobalt pigments
 Aureolin or cobalt yellow (PY40): potassium cobaltinitrite.

Iron Pigments
 Yellow ochre (PY43): a naturally occurring clay of monohydrated ferric oxide.

Lead pigments
 Naples yellow (PY41).

Strontium pigments
 Strontium yellow (PY32): 

Titanium pigments
 Titanium yellow (PY53): 

Tin Pigments
 Mosaic gold: stannic sulfide (SnS2).

Zinc Pigments
 Zinc yellow (PY36): zinc chromate, a highly toxic substance with anti-corrosive properties which was historically most often used to paint over metals.

Orange pigments

Bismuth pigments

Bismuth vanadate orange (PO83) non-toxic pigment similar to vermilion.

Cadmium pigments

Cadmium orange (PO20): an intermediate between cadmium red and cadmium yellow: cadmium sulfoselenide.

Chromium pigments
 
Chrome orange: a now obscure pigment composed of a mixture of lead chromate and lead(II) oxide (PbCrO4•PbO).

Red pigments

Arsenic pigments

Realgar: As4S4 - a highly toxic natural pigment.

Cadmium pigments

Cadmium red (PR108): cadmium sulfo-selenide (Cd2SSe).
 
Cerium pigments

Cerium sulfide red (PR265).

Iron oxide pigments

Sanguine, Caput mortuum, Indian red, Venetian red, oxide red (PR102).
Red ochre (PR102): anhydrous Fe2O3.
Burnt sienna (PBr7): a pigment produced by heating raw sienna.

Lead pigments

Minium (pigment): also known as red lead, lead tetroxide, Pb3O4.

Mercury pigments

Vermilion or cinnabar (PR106): HgS.

Brown pigments

Clay earth pigments (naturally formed iron oxides)

Raw umber (PBr7): a natural clay pigment consisting of iron oxide, manganese oxide and aluminum oxide: Fe2O3 + MnO2 + H2O + Si + Al2O3. When calcined (heated) it is referred to as burnt umber and has more intense colors.
Raw sienna (PBr7): a naturally occurring yellow-brown pigment from limonite clay. Used in art since prehistoric times.

Black pigments

Carbonaceous pigments 
Carbon black (PBk7).
Ivory black (PBk9).
Vine black (PBk8).
Lamp black (PBk6).

Iron pigments 
Mars black or Iron black (PBk11) (C.I. No.77499) Synthetic magnetite Fe3O4.
Manganese pigments
Manganese dioxide: blackish or brown in color, used since prehistoric times (MnO2).
Titanium pigments 
Titanium black: Titanium(III) oxide (Ti2O3).

White pigments
Antimony pigment
Antimony white: antimony(III) oxide (Sb2O3).
Barium pigments
Barium sulfate (PW5 or baryte): barium sulfate (BaSO4).
Lithopone: BaSO4•ZnS.
Lead pigment 
Cremnitz white (PW1): basic lead(II) carbonate.
Titanium pigment
Titanium white (PW6): titanium(IV) oxide (TiO2).
Zinc pigments
Zinc white (PW4): zinc oxide (ZnO).
Sachtolith: zinc sulfide (ZnS).

Fluorescent pigments

Uranium salts.

Safety
A number of pigments, especially traditional ones, contain heavy metals such as lead, mercury, and cadmium that are highly toxic.  The use of these pigments is now highly restricted in many countries.

See also
 List of dyes
 Blue pigments
 Green pigments
 Red pigments

References

External links